Cuvier's spiny-rat (Proechimys cuvieri) is a spiny rat species found in Brazil, French Guiana, Guyana, Peru and Suriname.

Phylogeny
Morphological characters and mitochondrial cytochrome b DNA sequences showed that P. cuvieri belongs to the so-called longicaudatus group of Proechimys species, and shares closer phylogenetic affinities with the other members of this clade: P. longicaudatus and P. brevicauda.

References

Proechimys
Mammals described in 1978
Taxa named by Francis Petter